Henry Antony Cardew Worrall Thompson (born 1 May 1951) is an English restaurateur and celebrity chef, television presenter and radio broadcaster.

Early life
Worrall Thompson was born in Stratford-upon-Avon, Warwickshire. His parents, Michael Ingham (real name Peter Michael Worrall Thompson) and Joanna Duncan, were both actors. He was educated at the King's School, Canterbury, where he sustained facial injuries while playing rugby. He had to wait until he was twenty-one years old before he could have plastic surgery to correct the disfigurement.

Early career
After he left school, he studied hotel management at Westminster Kingsway College. Taking his first catering job in Essex, it is rumoured that his grandmother refused to write to him because she could not bring herself to write "Essex" on the envelope. In 1978, he moved to London and became sous-chef at Brinkley's Restaurant at Fulham Road, becoming head chef one year later. The following year he took a sabbatical in France, eating and working his way around the local cuisine. After this he returned to Britain and started producing pans with his business partner Hassan.

Restaurants
Prior to opening his first restaurant, Worrall Thompson was Executive Chef at 190 Queens Gate in South Kensington, London. He opened his first restaurant, Ménage à Trois, in Knightsbridge in 1981, notable for only serving starters and puddings. He then launched several successful restaurants, including Wiz and Woz in west London and Metro in Jersey, all of which reflect his somewhat individual approach to food. Until late 2006, he was Catering Director for Old Luxters Barn, in Buckinghamshire.

In February 2009, his restaurant holding company AWT Restaurants was placed into administration. Four restaurants closed – the Notting Grill in west London, the Barnes Grill in south-west London, together with two pubs in Henley-on-Thames, the Lamb Inn and the Greyhound. This caused the loss of 60 jobs. Worrall Thompson personally bought back the remaining Windsor Grill in Berkshire, the Kew Grill in south-west London, and a delicatessen, the Windsor Larder.

It was revealed in April 2009 that Thompson's restaurant chain trouble was the result of its being "overstretched" and that his restaurants "had debts of more than £800,000 and owed 214 creditors money."

Television
Worrall Thompson made his first television appearance on BBC2's Food and Drink, before appearing on Ready Steady Cook from 1994. In 2001, he appeared on Lily Savage's Blankety Blank, and in 2003, he appeared in the second series of I'm a Celebrity... Get Me Out of Here!, which led to him replacing Gregg Wallace as the host of BBC2's Saturday Kitchen. The show moved to BBC1 to replace Saturday morning children's television. He later presented the ITV series Saturday Cooks. The show was renamed Daily Cooks Challenge for the prime-time series which he also presented. He represented the Midlands and East of England in series one of the BBC's Great British Menu but was beaten by Galton Blackiston, after burning the meat course of his entry prior to the judging phase. He was also on the mini series Trawlermen: Celebs at sea, in 2019.

He was the first ever contestant to score a 100 point correct answer on Pointless during his appearance on Pointless Celebrities in 2013.

Awards and honours
Worrall Thompson has won the Mouton Rothschild Menu Competition, and the Meilleur Ouvrier de Grande Bretagne (MOGB).

Personal life
Named Anthony at birth, he dropped the 'h' in his teenage years and has omitted it ever since. His reasoning is that the 'h' is not pronounced so adds little value to the name.

Worrall Thompson married Jill Thompson when he was 26, the couple divorced five years later. In 1983, he married an Australian, Militza Millar. The couple had two children and divorced. Since 1996, he has been married to his third wife, Jacinta Shiel. The couple live in High Wycombe and have two children.

In January 2012, he received a police caution for shoplifting items, including wine and cheese, from the Henley-on-Thames branch of Tesco on a total of five occasions. In 2015, he spoke of how the total of five shoplifting attempts was £70.68 and how he thinks he did it for the excitement; he was depressed and sought counselling.

Worrall Thompson is a patron of FOREST, a UK-based, tobacco industry-financed lobby opposing government regulation of tobacco and ASH. In February 2010, in a feature for Radio 4's Woman's Hour, he said that he had given up smoking.

He has been involved in fundraising for the Conservative Party and supported British withdrawal from the European Union.

In 2003, Worrall Thompson funded the Antony Worrall Thompson Trophy – a charity football cup played by eight semi-professional teams in the summer, pre-season. However, due to Worrall Thompson's financial issues, the trophy lasted initially one year with the 2003–2004 final being contested between Altrincham F.C. and Northwich Victoria F.C. Altrincham won the game 4–3. The tournament was resurrected in the 2017–2018 season.

October 2010 saw Worrall Thompson join Uncovered magazine as a regular columnist offering recipes and advice on eating for good health and seasons' finest produce.

References

External links

 
 Interview with asrecommended
 The Independent, 6 February 2005

1951 births
Living people
People from Stratford-upon-Avon
English chefs
People educated at The King's School, Canterbury
Worral Thompson, Antony
Theft
English television chefs
Conservative Party (UK) people
I'm a Celebrity...Get Me Out of Here! (British TV series) participants